Fondazione Cariplo is a charitable foundation in Milan, Italy. It was created in December 1991 when the Amato law, Law no. 218 of 30 July 1990, came into force. Under this law, saving banks were required to separate into a not-for-profit  foundation and a commercial banking arm. The Cassa di Risparmio delle Provincie Lombarde, commonly known as Cariplo, was divided into the Fondazione Cariplo and Cariplo SpA, the bank, which merged with Ambroveneto in 1998.

As at 31 December 2014, the organisation had a shareholders equity of €6,889,487,562.

Fondazione Cariplo is part of the Partner Circle of the Foundations Platform F20, a global network of foundations and other philanthropic organizations.

Bank ownership
At the end of year 2000, the foundation held 9.87% shares of Banca Intesa (fell from 18.55% circa before the merger of Intesa with Banca Commerciale Italiana) as well as 2.77% shares of Sanpaolo IMI. on 31 December 2006, the day before the merger of Intesa and Sanpaolo, the foundation was the second largest shareholder of Intesa after Crédit Agricole.

After the merger, the foundation fell to 5th largest shareholder for 4.68% of the shares of Intesa Sanpaolo (on 31 December 2007). However increased to third largest shareholder on 31 December 2014, after Compagnia di San Paolo (9.506%) and BlackRock (which acted as a fund manager for their client, 4.897%) The three other major shareholders with >2% were Ente Cassa di Risparmio di Firenze 3.248%, and Fondazione Cassa di Risparmio di Padova e Rovigo (4.162%), as well as Norges Bank 2.032%.

Other investments
Fondazione Cariplo was the largest shareholder (37.65%) of Quaestio Holding, the parent company of Quaestio Capital Management SGR, which was an Italian private equity fund manager. In turn, Fondazione Cariplo was one of the client of the manager, as the owner of the units of QUAMVIS S.C.A., SICAV-FIS - FUND ONE

See also 
Art collection of Fondazione Cariplo
 Fondazione Cariplo at Google Cultural Institute

References

Further reading
 N. Delai (2005). Valutare il non profit. Per una misurazione condivisa delle attività associative. Pearson Paravia Bruno Mondadori.
 Philipp Hoelscher (2006). Le fondazioni comunitarie in Italia e Germania. Maecenata Verlag.
 Pier Luigi Sacco (2006). Il fundraising per la cultura. Meltemi Editore.
 Greg Clark, Debra Mountford (2007). Investment strategies and financial tools for local development. Organisation for Economic Co-operation and Development.

1991 establishments in Italy
Organizations established in 1991
Intesa Sanpaolo
Banca Intesa
Banking foundations based in Italy
Organisations based in Milan